The 2019–20 Coupe de France preliminary rounds, Auvergne-Rhône-Alpes was the qualifying competition to decide which teams from the leagues of the Auvergne-Rhône-Alpes region of France took part in the main competition from the seventh round.

A total of nineteen teams qualified from the Auvergne-Rhône-Alpes preliminary rounds. In 2018–19, two teams reached the round of 16. FC Villefranche lost to Paris Saint-Germain after extra time, and AS Lyon Duchère lost to AS Vitré.

Schedule
The first two rounds took place on the weekends of 25 August 2019 and 1 September 2019. Additionally, there was be a cadrage, or intermediate framing round on 8 September 2019 to obtain the number of teams required in the third round. 798 teams took place in the first round, from tier 8 (Regional division 3) and below. One winning team (from first round tie number 311) was given a bye in the second round. There were six ties in the cadrage round.

The third round draw took place on 3 September 2019, with the 193 second round winner joined by the team given a bye, FC Belle Étoile Mercury, the team from Saint Pierre et Miquelon, AS Îlienne Amateurs, the 48 teams from Régional 2 (tier 7), the 22 teams from Régional 1 (tier 6) and the 11 teams from Championnat National 3 (tier 5).

The fourth round draw took place on 17 September 2019. The six teams from Championnat National 2 (tier 4) joined at this stage, with 72 ties being drawn.

The fifth round draw took place on 3 October 2019. The four teams from Championnat National (tier 3) joined at this stage, with 38 ties being drawn.

The sixth round draw took place on 17 October 2019. 19 ties were drawn.

First round
These matches were played on 24 and 25 August 2019.

Second round
These matches were played on 31 August and 1 September 2019, with one rearranged for 8 September.

Intermediate cadrage round
These matches were played on 8 September 2019.

Third round
These matches were played on 14 and 15 September 2019. The qualifying team from Saint Pierre et Miquelon are included in this round.

Fourth round
These matches were played on 28 and 29 September 2019.

Fifth round
These matches were played on 11, 12 and 13 October 2019.

Sixth round
These matches were played on 26 and 27 October 2019.

References

Preliminary rounds